Agriculture University, Jodhpur (AUJ) is an agricultural university in Jodhpur, Rajasthan, India. It was established in 2013 by the Government of Rajasthan under the Agriculture University, Jodhpur Act, 2013. Its jurisdiction covers six districts, namely Jodhpur, Barmer, Nagaur, Pali, Jalore  and Sirohi. Bagda Ram Choudhary was appointed vice chancellor in 2019.

Constituents 
AUJ has six constituent colleges:
 College of Agriculture, Jodhpur
 College of Agriculture, Sumerpur 
 College of Agriculture, Nagaur
 College of Agriculture, Baytu, Barmer
 Faculty of Dairy Technology, Jodhpur
 College of Technology and Agriculture Engineering, Jodhpur

Besides teaching, the university manages two agricultural research stations (Mandor, Jodhpur and Keshwana, Jalore), three agricultural research sub stations (Sumerpur, Nagaur and Samdari) and six Krishi Vigyan Kendras (Phalodi, Sirohi, Keshwana, Moulasar, Nagaur, Gudamalani).

References

External links
 

Universities in Jodhpur
Educational institutions established in 2013
2013 establishments in Rajasthan
Agricultural universities and colleges in Rajasthan